is a Japanese footballer who plays as a winger for J2 League club V-Varen Nagasaki, on loan from Kawasaki Frontale. He was born to a Burmese father and Japanese mother.

Career statistics

Club
.

Honours

Club
J1 League: 2021

References

External links

2001 births
Living people
People from Kawasaki, Kanagawa
Association football people from Kanagawa Prefecture
Japanese footballers
Association football forwards
J1 League players
J3 League players
Kawasaki Frontale players
Kataller Toyama players
V-Varen Nagasaki players
Japanese people of Burmese descent